Anaphosia is a genus of moths in the family Erebidae. The genus was erected by George Hampson in 1903.

Species
 Anaphosia astrigata Hampson, 1910
 Anaphosia aurantiaca Hampson, 1909
 Anaphosia caloxantha Hering, 1932
 Anaphosia cyanogramma Hampson, 1903
 Anaphosia eurygrapha Hampson, 1910
 Anaphosia extranea Debauche, 1938
 Anaphosia mirabilis Bartel, 1903
 Anaphosia parallela Bethune-Baker, 1911
 Anaphosia pectinata Hampson, 1910

References

Lithosiini
Moth genera